The 'Glasgow Journal' was a newspaper printed in Glasgow from 1741.

History

Founding
The newspaper was first printed on 20 July 1741. It was edited by Andrew Stalker, and was printed by Robert Urie and Co. for the editor and Alexander Carlisle, who were booksellers.

See also
List of newspapers in Scotland

References

1741 establishments in Scotland
Mass media in Glasgow